Grant Odishaw (born July 21, 1964) is a Canadian curler from Moncton, New Brunswick. He is an eight time provincial men's champion and former Canadian Mixed champion. He currently throws lead rocks for his brother Terry's team.

Career
Odishaw is a veteran of New Brunswick curling circles. He won his first of eight mixed provincial titles in 1986. He won another mixed title in 1989, and then again in 1991, and then he won five straight provincial mixed titles from 1993 to 1997. In 1994, he won the Canadian Mixed Curling Championship.

Odishaw has also won 9 provincial men's championships. The first was in 1991, where he played third for Gary Mitchell. The rink went 4–7, out of the playoffs at the 1991 Labatt Brier. Odishaw won his second provincial title in 1996 as the third for Mike Kennedy. The rink went 5–6 at the 1996 Labatt Brier. Odishaw won his third provincial title in 1999, this time playing for the Russ Howard rink. They had more success at the Brier in 1999, where they made the playoffs, but lost to Saskatchewan's Gerald Shymko in the 3 vs. 4 game.

It was with Howard that Odishaw had his most success. The team won another provincial title in 2000. At the 2000 Labatt Brier, they lost in the final British Columbia's Greg McAulay. Odishaw was a member of the Howard rink at the 2001 Canadian Olympic Curling Trials, which finished in 4th. They won another provincial title in 2002. They finished in third place at the 2002 Nokia Brier. They repeated in 2003, and finished in 4th at the 2003 Nokia Brier. And finally, they won a third straight provincial title in 2004. This time, at the 2004 Nokia Brier, the rink missed the playoffs after losing in a tiebreaker game to British Columbia's Jay Peachey.

Odishaw would not win another provincial title until 2012, as the lead for his brother's team.

Personal life
Odishaw is married and has two children. He is employed as a letter carrier for Canada Post.

References

External links

Living people
Curlers from New Brunswick
Sportspeople from Moncton
Canadian male curlers
Canadian mixed curling champions
Canadian curling coaches
1964 births
Curlers from Vancouver
Canada Cup (curling) participants